This is a list of tennis players who have represented the Russia Fed Cup team in an official Fed Cup match. Russia have taken part in the competition since 1968. Until 1991, Russian players represented the Soviet Union.

Players

References

External links
Russian Tennis Federation

Fed Cup
Lists of Billie Jean King Cup tennis players